Ballinadihy Bridge is a bridge situated  south-east of Aghabullogue village in County Cork, Ireland. The bridge is located at the meeting point of the townlands of Clonmoyle West and Peake, and lies within both the civil parish and Catholic parish of Aghabullogue.

The Ordnance Survey name book (c. 1840), refers to it as 'Ballinadighey Bridge'. In the Archaeological Inventory of County Cork, it is described as a road bridge over the Delehinagh River, with two semi-circular arches, roughly cut voussoirs, a pointed breakwater, and overflow channel to the south-west. Many of the surviving bridges in mid-Cork are originally constructed of stone, arched in shape, and late eighteenth or early nineteenth century in date. Typical features often include semi-circular arches and pointed breakwaters. Earlier bridges are often narrower, although some were widened at a later stage.

O'Donoghue (1986) refers to Ballinadihy Bridge as being located at the southern end of Clonmoyle West townland, and holds the Irish version of Ballinadihy as Béal Áth na Daibhche, meaning 'ford mouth of the hollow'.

See also
Clonmoyle Racecourse
Aghabullogue Bridge

References

External links
 1841 surveyed OS map (maps.osi.ie)
 1901 surveyed OS map (maps.osi.ie)
 acrheritage.info

Bridges in County Cork